Maracaju is a municipality located in the Brazilian state of Mato Grosso do Sul, in the southwest. Its population was 48,022 (2020) and its area is 5,299 km². Its elevation is 421m.

References 

Municipalities in Mato Grosso do Sul